J3, J03, J 3 or J-3 may refer to:

Roads 
 County Route J3 (California)
 Malaysia Federal Route J3

Submarines 
 Junsen type submarine
 HMAS J3, an Australian submarine

Aircraft 
 Junkers J 3, a German Junkers aircraft
 J-3, a U.S. Navy airship 
 Piper J-3, a 1938 light aircraft

Other uses 
 J3 perturbation, gravitational force caused by an imperfect symmetry north–south of an object being orbited
 J3 Operations Directorate, part of the US Joint Chiefs of Staff
 GS&WR Class J3, an Irish steam locomotive
 JAC J3, a subcompact car produced by JAC Motors
 Janko group J3, in mathematics
 Eupheme (temporarily designated S/2003 J 3), a satellite of Jupiter
 J3 League, Japanese football league
 Northwestern Air IATA code
 J03: acute tonsillitis ICD-10 code
 Triangular cupola, Johnson Solid number 3
 Samsung Galaxy J3, a smartphone by Samsung
 J3 battlecruiser, a British military vessel design from 1920s
 LNER Class J3, a class of British steam locomotives